is a fantasy anime television series animated by Trans Arts (with production assistance by Production I.G).

A related manga, began serialization on February 28, 2007 in Monthly Comic Blade, one of Mag Garden's magazines.

A second season started on January 1, 2008, picking up just where the first season left off.

Plot
On the first season, Rita, the princess of the Kingdom of Wellber, stabs her sadist betrothed, Prince Gernia of Sangatras, and flees the city together with Tina, a feisty cat burglar who has given her refuge and offered to hire on as her bodyguard. Rita must travel on a secret diplomatic mission to the remote Kingdom of Greedom in a last-ditch attempt to prevent a full-scale war between Wellber and Sangatras.

In the second season, Sisters of Wellber Zwei, the group arrived at Greedom just in time to prevent a war between Wellber and Sangatras. After this is resolved, Tina is looking for information about her parents' murderer, the man with the wasp tattoo.

Characters

A professional cat burglar, Tina gets involved with the kingdom's princess Rita when she breaks into the royal palace to steal a golden statue. Tina is very skilled with her pistols, but prefers not to kill people. She was hired by Weiss as Rita's bodyguard, and the two of them have set out for the kingdom of Greedom, where Tina hopes to find the murderer of her parents.

A princess in the Kingdom of Wellber. She stabs the Sangatras kingdom's prince, her betrothed who was attempting to rape her, and flees the palace together with Tina. To prevent a war with Sangatras, Rita's only hope is to travel to the neutral Kingdom of Greedom on a secret diplomatic mission. Surprisingly, for a sheltered princess, Rita is quite proficient in hand-to-hand combat. Later, she becomes affectionate towards Tina and is shown in one episode thanking Tina with a warm kiss on the cheek.

A highly mobile and unusually well-armed tankette with an advanced A.I. Serving as a transportation vehicle in lieu of a horse for Rita, Cyrano refuses to let commoners such as Tina mount him. He also serves as an advisor for Rita. He is a little overprotective to Rita as well as a bit expressive, but he's devoutly loyal to her. Cyrano is equipped with two shield-like amovible panels, a small sub-cannon and a powerful main cannon, which renders him asleep after its use.
He appears to be named after Cyrano de Bergerac, who was a 17th-century French dramatist, and was portrayed in an eponymously named play by Edmond Rostand. In the play, he not only a writer, but also France's greatest swordsman. However, he is unable to woo the beautiful Roxanne because of insecurity regarding his large nose, and so he vicariously woos her with his writing, but through another suitor.
Bergerac used to be a normal human being before living as a tank. He was one of Wellber's royal guards who met Renaldo Vinci, a frail but famous engineer, and quickly became fascinated by his work. However, Bergerac was ordered to kill Renaldo so he will not develop machinery for rival countries. Bergerac could not do such and warned Renaldo about it, but not before he got caught by his lieutenant. As he was about to shoot Renaldo, Bergerac took his pistol, destined to kill Renaldo, and kill his lieutenant. However, the lieutenant took one last breath and mortally shot Bergerac to the chest. As Renaldo watched his friend dies, he decided to put Bergerac's mind into the tank so he could live. Back in Episode 1, it is assumed that Bergerac was locked up as punishment for disobeying orders and killing his lieutenant, but was freed when Tina and Rita fled Wellber.

Sherry

A sprite that is friends with Tina. She has the habit of finishing every sentence with the word "beru".

Galahad Eiger

A military officer of Sangatras and a friend of Prince Gernia since childhood, he made it his personal mission to avenge Gernia by killing Rita.  His sword has a pistol hidden within, which he would use for ranged combat as well as to wound unsuspecting opponents.  After learning Gernia's secret, however, he deserted with his ultimate intention unknown to others.

Ruler of the Kingdom of Wellber.

Rodin Sior

Prince of the Kingdom of Wellber and elder brother of Rita, whom he quite cares for.  He has a fortune-telling ability and is convinced that Wellber is in grave danger. It is revealed that Rodin is the infamous Death Wasp murdered who slew Tina's parents. However, he later reveals to her that he was part of a special unit that got decimated in a battle. Upon seeing the dead bodies of his comrades, Rodin went insane for a moment and killed dozens of citizens and soldiers.

Weiss

A much-trusted military officer of King Hydel.  The quest for Greedom was given via him.

Jin

Both a business and romantic partner of Tina's. He sells the items that Tina steals on the black market.

Prince of Sangatras, to whom Rita was betrothed. He is stabbed by Rita when he tries to rape her, apparently, on his official visit.

Rambernoff
Ruler of the Kingdom of Sangatras.  He sends his son Gernia to marry Rita while plotting to wage war against Wellber at the same time.  There is no better excuse than his son being assaulted by the princess of Wellber.

The commanding officer of the Sangatras Army's White Lion Regiment, seemingly in a relationship with Galahad.

First season episodes

Second season episodes
This series is known as Sisters of Wellber Zwei.

Staff

External links
  Official website
  Production I.G site
 Production I.G site
 
 

2007 anime television series debuts
2008 anime television series debuts
Anime with original screenplays
Fantasy anime and manga
Mag Garden manga
Production I.G
Tokyo MX original programming
Shōnen manga